Rysy is a mountain in the crest of the High Tatras, eastern part of the Tatra Mountains, lying on the border between Poland and Slovakia. The north-western summit is the highest point of Poland and belongs to the Crown of Polish Mountains; the other two summits are on the Slovak side of the border.

Name
A folk explanation on the Slovak side says that the name comes from the plural word rysy meaning "lynxes", although the habitat of the lynx does not extend above the timberline.

The Hungarian name Tengerszem-csúcs and the German name Meeraugspitze mean "eye-of-the-sea peak", from the glacial lake at the northern foot of the mountain, called "eye of the sea" (Morskie Oko in Polish).

History
The first known ascent was made in 1840, by Ede Blásy and his guide Ján Ruman-Driečny, Sr. The first winter ascent was completed in 1884, by Theodor Wundt and Jakob Harvey.

Tourism
Rysy is the highest peak in the Tatra Mountains that is accessible to individual tourists on foot without a mountain guide. 

Between November 1 and June 15, the trail and chalet on the Slovak side is closed.  

The mountain can also be ascended from the Polish side coming from the Morskie Oko lake, which is a more spectacular route, but at the same time more difficult and more exposure. The trail leads from Morskie Oko to Czarny Staw, and from there first along the northern slope and then the west wall. Due to this location, winter conditions prevail on this trail very often still in the second half of June and winter equipment is required to ascent.

The winter ascent from the Polish side is a serious climb requiring the right equipment (crampons, ice axe) and skills, often with a large avalanche threat. There have been serious avalanche events, including fatal ones. The average slope of the slope above the Czarny Staw is around 30 degrees. In the Rysa couloir, about 40 degrees to its half. In the upper part, the incline reaches up to 44 degrees. 

Since the accession of Poland and Slovakia to the Schengen Agreement in 2007, the border between the two countries may be easily crossed at this point like at any other.

See also

 Orla Perć
 Giewont
 Tourism in Poland
 Tourism in Slovakia
 Geography of Poland
 Geography of Slovakia
 Tatra Volunteer Search and Rescue (Poland)
 Mountain Rescue Service (Slovakia)
 List of highest paved roads in Europe
 List of mountain passes

References

External links

 TOPR - Polish Tatra Mountain Rescue Service
 Additional photos
 Rysy at Peakbagger.com
 Chalet below the Rysy peak
 Additional information including some photos

3D Panorama
 Polish summit 2499 m
 Slovak summit 2503 m
 Standard weather on the summit
 Hike to Rysy (from the Polish side)
 Hike to Rysy (from the Slovak side)

Two-thousanders of Poland
Two-thousanders of Slovakia
Mountains of the Western Carpathians
Poland–Slovakia border
International mountains of Europe
High Tatras
Highest points of countries